McGrigor is a surname. Notable people with the surname include:

Alexander Bennett McGrigor  (1827–1891), Scottish lawyer, university administrator and bibliophile
James McGrigor (1771–1858), Scottish physician
Jamie McGrigor (born 1949), Scottish politician
Rhoderick McGrigor (1893–1959), British Royal Navy admiral

See also
McGrigor Baronets
McGrigors, a British law firm